Atlético Petróleos de Luanda, also known as Petro Atlético de Luanda, or simply Petro Atlético or Petro de Luanda, is a football club from Luanda, Angola, founded in 1980. The club won its first title, the Angolan League, in 1982 and is the most successful team in the country.

In its initial days, the club was known as Petroclube.

Four players from Petro Atlético represented Angola at their first World Cup in 2006: Lebo Lebo, Lamá, Zé Kalanga and Delgado.

The club has also a basketball team. Many basketball players of the team, participated with Angola national basketball team in the Olympics 2008.

Achievements
Angolan League: 16
1982, 1984, 1986, 1987, 1988, 1989, 1990, 1993, 1994, 1995, 1997, 2000, 2001, 2008, 2009, 2022
Angola Cup: 12
 1987, 1992, 1993, 1994, 1997, 1998, 2000, 2002, 2012, 2013, 2017, 2021
Angola Super Cup: 6
 1987, 1988, 1993, 1994, 2002, 2013

Recent seasons
Petro de Luanda's season-by-season performance since 2001:

 PR = Preliminary round, R1 = First round, GS = Group stage, R32 = Round of 32, R16 = Round of 16, QF = Quarter-finals, SF = Semi-finals, RU = Runner-Up, W = Winner

Performance in CAF competitions

CAF Champions League: 7 appearances

1998 – Second Round
2001 – Semi-Finals
2002 – First Round
2004 – Third Round
2007 – First Round
2009 – First Round
2010 – Second Round
2019−20 – Group Stage 
2020−21 – Group Stage 
2021−22 – Semi-Finals

 African Cup of Champions Clubs: 9 appearances

1983: Second Round
1985: First Round
1987: First Round
1988: Second Round
1989: First Round
1990: First Round
1991: Second Round
1994: First Round
1995: First Round

CAF Confederation Cup: 7 appearances

2004 – Group Stage
2006 – Group Stage
2008 – First Round
2010 – Second Round of 16
2013 – First Round
2014 – Second Round of 16
2015 –

CAF Cup: 1 appearance
1997 – Finalist

CAF Cup Winners' Cup: 4 appearances
1992 – First Round
1993 – Second Round
1999 – First Round
2003 – First Round

Logo
At a General Assembly meeting held on June 27, 2020, it was decided that the former logo should be reinstated with a few minor adjustments.

Players and staff

Players

Squad

Staff

Manager history

Chairman history
 Tomás Faria – 2014–present
 Mateus de Brito  – 2012–2014
 Cardoso Pereira – 2008–2011
 Paulo Gouveia Júnior – 2004–2007
 Silva Neto – 1999–2003
 Botelho de Vasconcelos – 1990–1999

Other sports
 Petro Atlético Basketball
 Petro Atlético Handball
 Petro Atlético Hockey

See also
 Girabola
 Gira Angola

External links
 Girabola.com profile
 Zerozero.pt profile
 SoccerWay profile
 Facebook profile

References

Association football clubs established in 1980
Petro Atletico
Petro Atletico
1980 establishments in Angola
Sports clubs in Angola